Jeff Chase (born Jeffrey L. Sniffen; January 17, 1968) is an American film and television actor who played for the Albany Firebirds of the Arena Football League.

Chase was born in Paterson, New Jersey. Raised in Totowa, New Jersey and West Paterson (now Woodland Park), he attended Passaic Valley Regional High School. He attended West Virginia University and, as Jeff Sniffen, played offensive tackle on the football team from 1986 to 1991. He played one season of professional football for the Albany Firebirds of the Arena Football League.

While filming the Dexter episode The Damage a Man Can Do, in which Chase was a stuntman, actor Jimmy Smits accidentally stabbed Chase with a real knife instead of a fake one. Smits is said to have missed the plastic protection eight times out of ten during rehearsal, but was able to aim correctly while accidentally wielding the real knife.

Filmography
 2020 Arkansas as Thomas
 2019 Escape Plan: The Extractors as Frankie
 2019 Jay and Silent Bob Reboot as Pitchfork Guy
 2017 Baby Driver as Jeffrey (uncredited)
 2016 True Memoirs of an International Assassin as La Roche
 2015 Dark Places as Calvin Diehl
 2014 Let's Be Cops as Leka
 2013 Under the Dome as "Boomer" Platt
 2013 Missionary as Brian
 2013 Escape Plan as Prisoner Beaten By Breslin
 2013 Star Trek Into Darkness as Security Officer
 2013 Pain & Gain as Prison Brawler (uncredited)
 2013 Banshee as Jeffrey Thompson (2 episodes)
 2012 Looper as Tall Gat Man
 2012 Rock of Ages as Stacee's Bodyguard
 2011 Kill the Irishman as Joe Buka
 2011 Swamp Shark as Jason "Swamp Thing" Broussard
 2011 The Mechanic as Burke
 2010 The Spy Next Door as Russian
 2009 Star Trek as "Dexter", Alien Cadet
 2008 Dexter (TV series) as Billy Fleeter (1 episode)
 2008 The Year of Getting to Know Us as Arnold
 2007 Ace Ventura: Pet Detective, Jr. as Pennington Bodyguard 
 2007 Loaded as Thug
 2007 Sydney White as Ron "Big Ron"
 2007 Burn Notice (TV series) as Wayne Ray (1 episode)
 2007 Redline as Gumba #5
 2007 Undead or Alive as Zombie
 2007 Nurses (TV) as 370 lb Man
 2006 What About Brian (TV series) as Bouncer (1 episode)
 2006 The Marine as Billy
 2006 Mission: Impossible III as Davian's Bodyguard
 2006 Pepper Dennis (TV series) as Poker Guy (1 episode)
 2006 Huff (TV series) as Bouncer (1 episode)
 2005 Kids in America as Assistant Coach Fasso
 2005 Monk (TV series) as Fire Starter (1 episode)
 2005 Transporter 2 as Vasily
 2001-2005 Alias (TV series) as Large Russian (5 episodes)
 2004 The Punisher as Saint's Enforcer (uncredited)
 2004 She Spies (TV series) as Giant Morgue Worker (1 episode)
 2004 Lenny the Wonder Dog as Panky
 2003 The Rundown as Jamal Johnson
 2003 Dickie Roberts: Former Child Star as Man In Car (uncredited)
 2003 Nip/Tuck (TV series) as Jose (1 episode)
 2003 Dunsmore as Boone
 2002 Cedric the Entertainer Presents (TV series) as Galley Slave (2 episodes)
 2002 NYPD Blue (TV series) as Ray Morrison (1 episode)
 2002 All About the Benjamins as Mango
 2001 Black Knight as The Giant (uncredited)
 2001 Sheena (TV series) as Thug #1 (1 episode)
 2001 In the Shadows as Sergei

References

External links

Moviefone Entry

1968 births
Male actors from New Jersey
American male film actors
American stunt performers
American male television actors
Actors from Paterson, New Jersey
People from Totowa, New Jersey
People from Woodland Park, New Jersey
Players of American football from New Jersey
West Virginia Mountaineers football players
Living people